Buz Verno (born September 28, 1953 in Staten Island, New York, United States) is an American bass guitarist, songwriter and singer.  After his father encouraged him to start playing music, Verno  began to play guitar at seven years old.  He switched to bass guitar at 12 years old.

Career
Verno has played with The Rats, Beau Jack, Cherry Vanilla, The Staten Island Boys, David Johansen Group, Sylvain Sylvain and the Teenage News, The Others, and Helen Schneider. Verno received his first gold record in 1982 for the album Helen Schneider with The Kick.

During his career, Verno has toured with Tom Petty and the Heartbreakers, Earl Slick, David Johansen, Sylvain Sylvain, Greg Allen, Cherry Vanilla, Helen Schneider, Thomas Trask, Johnny Ráo, Tom Morrongiello, Joey Kelly and others.

Discography
Verno credited appearances, excluding compilations:

Cherry Vanilla & Her Staten Island Band
1976 Max's Kansas City (1976)

David Johansen
 David Johansen (1978)
 In Style (1979)

David Johansen Group
The David Johansen Group Live (1978)
Live (1993)

Helen Schneider
Schneider with The Kick (1981)
Breakout (1983)

Pandora
 Unreleased 7" promo flexidisc (1974)
 Space Amazon (1997)

Sylvain Sylvain 
Sylvain Sylvain (1979)

References

1953 births
Living people
People from Staten Island
American rock bass guitarists
American blues guitarists
American rock singers
American blues singers
Songwriters from New York (state)